Marcelo Vido (born 15 January 1959) is a Brazilian former professional basketball player and coach.

Playing career
During his pro club playing career, Vido won the 1979 edition of the FIBA Intercontinental Cup, while a member of EC Sírio. As a member of the senior Brazilian national basketball team, Vido played at the following major world tournaments: the 1978 FIBA World Cup, the 1980 Summer Olympics, the 1982 FIBA World Cup, the 1984 Summer Olympics, and the 1986 FIBA World Cup.

Coaching career
After he ended his basketball playing career, Vido began a new career, working as a professional basketball coach.

References

External links
 

1959 births
Living people
Brazilian basketball coaches
Basketball players at the 1980 Summer Olympics
Basketball players at the 1984 Summer Olympics
Brazilian men's basketball players
1978 FIBA World Championship players
1982 FIBA World Championship players
Esporte Clube Sírio basketball players
Franca Basquetebol Clube players
Olympic basketball players of Brazil
Small forwards
Sport Club Corinthians Paulista basketball players
Basketball players from São Paulo
1986 FIBA World Championship players